Icons & Influences is an album by pianist George Cables that was recorded in 2013 and released on the HighNote label early the following year.

Reception

The AllMusic review by Matt Collar said "As with all of Cables' albums, Icons & Influences is a fluid, urbane album full of engaging modern jazz".

On All About Jazz, Jack Bowers stated "on the trio date Icons and Influences Cables warmly salutes a number of those who have helped frame his musical persona and escorted him along a journey of wonder and discovery that has enabled him to become the superbly talented artist he is today ... Dedications aside, this is a splendid trio session led by one of the jazz world's more proficient and accessible contemporary pianists. Full credit to Cables, Douglas and Lewis for a job well done".

Track listing 
All compositions by George Cables except where noted
 "Cedar Walton" – 4:34
 "Farewell Mulgrew" – 6:48
 "Happiness" – 6:25
 "The Duke" (Dave Brubeck) – 7:24
 "Come Sunday" (Duke Ellington) – 7:04
 "Little B's Poem" (Bobby Hutcherson) – 6:35
 "Nature Boy" (eden ahbez) – 6:56
 "Very Early" (Bill Evans) – 6:29
 "Isotope" (Joe Henderson) – 5:12
 "The Very Thought of You" (Ray Noble) – 6:31
 "Mo' Pan" (Aldwyn Roberts) – 5:31
 "Blue Heart" (Benny Golson) – 2:38

Personnel 
George Cables – piano
Dezron Douglas - bass 
Victor Lewis – drums

References 

George Cables albums
2014 albums
HighNote Records albums